USS Idaho (SP-545) was an existing 60-foot-long motorboat purchased by the U.S. Navy during World War I. She was outfitted as an armed patrol craft and assigned to the Fourth Naval District based at League Island Navy Yard, near Philadelphia, Pennsylvania. Her patrol duties stretched from Philadelphia on the Delaware River to Cape May, New Jersey, on the Delaware Bay. Post-war she was returned to her owner.

Commissioned at Cape May, N.J. 

The third ship to be so named by the U.S. Navy, Idaho (SP-545), a motor boat, was built in 1907 by Stearns & McKay, Marblehead, Massachusetts; acquired from her owner, W. W. Vensel of Pittsburgh, Pennsylvania, in June 1917; and commissioned at Cape May, New Jersey, 12 July 1917.

World War I service 

Idaho was attached to the 4th Naval District which was headquartered at League Island Navy Yard on the Delaware River near Philadelphia, Pennsylvania.

She was assigned to patrol and general duties, serving on harbor entrance patrol, and submarine net patrol in the Cape May and Philadelphia areas.

Post-war disposition 
She was out of commission during the winter of 1917-18, and finally returned to her owner 30 November 1918.

References 

 
 USS Idaho (SP-545), 1917-1918; Later renamed SP-545

Patrol vessels of the United States Navy
Motorboats of the United States Navy
Ships built in Marblehead, Massachusetts
1907 ships
World War I patrol vessels of the United States